Dennis M. Cohoon (born March 29, 1953) is the Iowa State Representative from the 87th District. He has served in the Iowa House of Representatives since 1987.

Education
Cohoon graduated from Burlington High School in 1971. After graduating high school, he attended Southeastern Community College where he earned an associate degree in business. He received his BA in business administration and business education with minors in special education and psychology from Iowa Wesleyan College. He has also done graduate work in special education at the University of Iowa.

Personal
Cohoon has been collecting Presidential memorabilia such as buttons, stamps, cards, and busts since he was seven years old. He is also a fan of University of Iowa Hawkeye basketball and the New York Yankees.

Career
From 1973 to 1979 Cohoon served in the Iowa Army National Guard. In 1978, he began teaching in the Burlington School District. He spent 32 years teaching special education in the Burlington School District until retiring in 2010.

Cohoon currently serves on several committees in the Iowa House - the Appropriations committee; the Education committee; the Local Government committee; and the Transportation committee.  He also serves as chair of the Transportation, Infrastructure, and Capitals Appropriations Subcommittee.

Cohoon was re-elected in 2006 with 7,201 votes, running unopposed.

Family
Cohoon is the son of Meril, a railroad worker and Marie Cohoon, a homemaker. He has two sisters, Judy and Sally. He has been married to his wife Sue, a math teacher, since 1998 and together they have four step children.

Organizations

Past memberships
Burlington Education Association
Geode Education Association
Iowa State Education Association

Current memberships
Des Moines County Democratic Central Committee
First Christian Church

Family
Cohoon is the son of Meril, a railroad worker and Marie Cohoon, a homemaker. He has two sisters, Judy and Sally. He has been married to his wife Sue, a math teacher, since 1998 and together they have four step children.

References

External links
Representative Dennis Cohoon official Iowa General Assembly site
Dennis Cohoon State Representative official constituency site
 

Democratic Party members of the Iowa House of Representatives
Living people
1953 births
Politicians from Burlington, Iowa
21st-century American politicians